Bewdley railway station serves the town of Bewdley in Worcestershire, England. Until 2014, it was the administrative headquarters of the Severn Valley Railway, after which they were moved to Comberton Hill, Kidderminster. Bewdley is the principal intermediate station on the line.

History
Bewdley station originally opened in 1862 as one of the main intermediate stations on the  line between Hartlebury and Shrewsbury. It was operated by the West Midland Railway, before that company was absorbed into the Great Western Railway (GWR).

Thus, Bewdley became a junction station.

The GWR opened a "loop-line" to Kidderminster in 1878, which meant that Bewdley had a direct link with the town and became a double junction. As a legacy of its former junction status, Bewdley station is unique on the SVR in that it has two signal boxes, Bewdley North and Bewdley South.

Bewdley station was at its busiest at weekends and local holiday periods, but traffic declined with the increasing use of cars in the 1950s. As a consequence, rationalisation resulted in the end of through passenger traffic — firstly on the Wyre Forest line in 1962, followed by the Severn Valley line in 1963. Although thought by some to have been a result of the Beeching Axe, those closures pre-dated Beeching's report.

Until January 1970, British Rail continued to serve the last remaining stations of Stourport-on-Severn, Burlish Halt, Bewdley, Foley Park Halt and Kidderminster.

Stationmasters

Thomas Appleton 1862 – 1897
George Smith 1898 – 1909 (afterward station master at Chipping Norton)
Frederick Hallett 1909 – 1914
Alfred W. Cooke 1923 – 1937 (formerly station master at Cleobury Mortimer)
E.T. Rose 1939 – 1942 (afterward station master at Broadway)
William H. Needle until 1956 (afterward station master at Totnes)
H.E. Ray 1956 – 1960 (afterward station master at Bridgnorth)

Preservation
Bewdley was disused for only four years before preservationists from the new SVR Company bought the land, track and buildings in 1974, enabling the SVR to extend from Bridgnorth–Hampton Loade to Highley and eventually Bewdley that same year.

From 1980 onwards, occasional bank holiday services were operated to Bewdley, originally from Kidderminster and later from Birmingham New Street. The SVR's own services to Kidderminster could not commence until sugar beet traffic to Foley Park ceased in 1982, and its own station, Kidderminster Town, was opened, which occurred two years later.

During and after preservation:
The station clock on platforms 2 & 3 was brought from Stourbridge Junction railway station.
The longer valancing pieces on the east side of the island platform canopy came from Birmingham Snow Hill station. That is marked on the canopy. The canopy itself was constructed for the opening of the line to Kidderminster and was later extended. It was not brought in from elsewhere, as has been reported.

Bewdley Tunnel
Just to the East of the station lies the -long Bewdley Tunnel.

Future services 
Due to heavy congestion in the Wyre Forest, there have been calls for Bewdley station to be returned to the National Rail network. The idea of Kidderminster to Bewdley trains has been discussed at meetings with Central Trains, its successors London Midland, West Midlands Trains and Chiltern Railways. The obstacle was always the question of who would provide the infrastructure and staff. New services could run further than Kidderminster, to Birmingham, Dudley or London.  West Midlands Trains says it plans to operate extensions of services from Kidderminster to the station by December 2019.

Famous Media Appearances 
Bewdley Railway Station has been used as a location for a number of television and cinema productions. These include the 1992 film Howards End, the 2007 film Woes of the Departed, and, as "Musborough Junction" station, the opening scenes of the 1984 BBC Television adaptation of the John Masefield novel The Box of Delights (keen-eyed viewers will spot the Bewdley station sign reflected in a window).

References

Further reading

External links

 Official Station Web Site

Heritage railway stations in Worcestershire
Railway stations in Great Britain opened in 1862
Railway stations in Great Britain closed in 1970
Railway stations in Great Britain opened in 1974
Former Great Western Railway stations
Severn Valley Railway
Railway station
1862 establishments in England